Minoff is a surname. Notable people with the surname include:

Alex Minoff, American musician
Marvin Minoff (1931–2009), American film and television producer